is a former Japanese football player and manager.

Playing career
Hattori was born in Maebashi on August 30, 1971. After graduating from University of Tsukuba, he joined Yokohama Flügels in 1994. He played many matches from first season and the club won the champions 1994–95 Asian Cup Winners' Cup. In 1997, he became a regular forward and scored 11 goals. At 1997 Emperor's Cup, he scored 4 goals and the club won the 2nd place. In July 1998, he moved to Japan Football League club Kawasaki Frontale. In 1999, he moved to Shimizu S-Pulse. However he could hardly play in the match. In 2000, he moved to J2 League club Albirex Niigata and he played many matches. In June 2000, he moved to Avispa Fukuoka. Although he played many matches, the club was relegated to J2 from 2002. In 2003, he moved to J2 club Sagan Tosu. He retired end of 2003 season.

Coaching career
In 2015, Hattori became a manager for J2 League club Thespakusatsu Gunma. However the club results were bad, he resigned end of 2016 season.

Club statistics

Managerial statistics

References

External links
 
 

1971 births
Living people
University of Tsukuba alumni
Association football people from Gunma Prefecture
Japanese footballers
J1 League players
J2 League players
Japan Football League (1992–1998) players
Yokohama Flügels players
Kawasaki Frontale players
Shimizu S-Pulse players
Albirex Niigata players
Avispa Fukuoka players
Sagan Tosu players
Japanese football managers
J2 League managers
Thespakusatsu Gunma managers
Association football forwards